Panagia Ekatontapiliani (literally the church with 100 doors) or Panagia Katapoliani is a historic Byzantine church complex in Parikia town, on the island of Paros in Greece. The church complex contains a main chapel surrounded by two more chapels and a baptistery with a cruciform font.

The origin of the church's name is obscure, as it does not have one hundred doors, or gates.  One theory suggests that it is a corruption of the name "Katapoliani", i.e. "Lower Town church", as it lies by the sea in the lower part of the town of Parikia.

The church dates to 326.  Its oldest features likely predate the adoption of Christianity as the state religion of the Roman Empire in 391. The church was purportedly founded by the mother of the Roman Emperor Constantine the Great (ruled 306–337), Saint Helen, during her pilgrimage to the Holy Land when she stopped to worship at a chapel on the island. Later Justinian is credited for initiating construction on the site as well. The site was badly damaged by an earthquake in the 18th century, but gradually restored.  The Ekatontapyliani is a renowned Marian pilgrimage church of the Aegean, second only to the famed Megalochare church on nearby Tinos Island.

References

External links

 Battistero di Parros su BeWeB - Beni ecclesiastici in web.

326 establishments
320s establishments in the Roman Empire
4th-century churches
Eastern Orthodox church buildings in Greece
Buildings and structures in Paros
Byzantine church buildings in Greece
Tourist attractions in the South Aegean
Helena, mother of Constantine I